The flag of Magdalena is the official flag of the department of Magdalena, Colombia. It consists of six horizontal stripes of red and blue; the red stands for the blood spilled by the patriots throughout its history in the pursuit of freedom, and the blue represents the waters that surround it. Red and blue also represent integrity and firmness of the Magdaleniense's soul. There are 30 stars on the flag that form the star itself.

The colors are also used in the logo and uniform of the Unión Magdalena, the department's association football team, and appear in the coat of arms of Magdalena as well.

See also
 Coat of arms of the Department of Magdalena

References
 

Flag
Flags of the departments of Colombia